Ilaiyavan ( Young Guy) is a 2000 Indian Tamil-language film directed by Babu. The film featured Sathyan alongside Kausalya, while Sivakumar and Srividya play supporting roles. The film, which had music composed by Ilaiyaraaja, opened on 22 September 2000.

Cast
Sathyan as Bharathi
Kausalya as Janani
Karan
Sivakumar
Srividya
Thalaivasal Vijay
Vaiyapuri
Madhan Bob
S. N. Lakshmi
Fathima Babu
T. S. Raghavendra

Production
The film marked the acting debut of Sathyan, nephew of actor Sathyaraj and son of producer Madhampatti Sivakumar.

Soundtrack
The music was composed by Ilaiyaraaja and released by Saregama.

Release
The film opened in September 2000 to mixed reviews, with a critic noting that the film fails due to the miscasting of the lead actor. A reviewer from The Hindu noted "melodious music, enchanting visuals, good dialogues, all these and other plus points offset the mediocre screenplay of Shenbagam Movies Ilayavan".

References

2000 films
Films scored by Ilaiyaraaja
2000s Tamil-language films
Indian drama films